Febi Mani (also credited as Febi Srikanth Deva) is an Indian playback singer who has worked in the Indian film industry. Febi worked extensively with A. R. Rahman during the late 1990s and early 2000s, while also regularly collaborating with Harris Jayaraj.

Career
Early in her career, Febi Mani collaborated frequently with A. R. Rahman, working on big budget projects including for "Kokku Saiva Kokku" from K. S. Ravikumar's Muthu (1995), "Love Theme" from Shankar's Jeans (1998) and "Dil Se Re" in Mani Ratnam's Dil Se (1998). The Hindustan Times called "Strawberry Kanne" from Minsara Kanavu (1997), sung by Kay Kay and Febi Mani, as "one of the most engaging tracks Rahman has ever composed" adding the musician employed "fabulous use of a motley assortment of instruments in the song that drove the story forward in the movie". Other notable early work by the singer included "Kanni Pengal" from the Ajith Kumar-starrer Kaadhal Mannan (1998), "Kikku Yerudhey" from Padayappa (1999) and "Oh Mariya" from Kadhalar Dhinam (1999).

Following her marriage, Febi reduced her work commitments and has worked on film albums less often.

Personal life
Febi Mani married music director Srikanth Deva on 20 February 2005 in Chennai. The event was attended by several film personalities from the Tamil film industry including Rajinikanth, A. R. Rahman and Suriya, who were acquainted with either Febi, Srikanth or Srikanth's father, music composer Deva. Their first daughter, Varanya, was born in 2007.

Notable discography

References

External links
 

Living people
Indian women playback singers
Tamil playback singers
Kannada playback singers
Telugu playback singers
Singers from Chennai
Tamil singers
Women musicians from Tamil Nadu
20th-century Indian singers
21st-century Indian singers
20th-century Indian women singers
21st-century Indian women singers
Year of birth missing (living people)